The boules sports competition at the 2022 World Games took place in July 2022, in Birmingham in United States, at the University of Alabama Birmingham.
Originally scheduled to take place in July 2021, the Games were rescheduled for July 2022 as a result of the 2020 Summer Olympics postponement due to the COVID-19 pandemic.
 This was the first time that only women's events were held as part of the boules sports programme at The World Games. It was also the first time since raffa's introduction at the 2009 World Games that it was not contested.

Qualification

Medal table

Participating nations

Events

Women

References

External links
 The World Games 2022
 Boules Sports Federation site

 
2022 World Games